Hip and buttock padding is used to increase the apparent size of the hips and buttocks in order to increase apparent waist-hip ratio which implies more feminine body shape. It is used by both sexes: women wishing to increase their physical attractiveness, some transgender people including transsexuals and cross-dressers, and performers both male in drag and female. This technique is often used by drag queens to create the illusion of a feminine figure, often taking it to the extreme for comedic value.

Garment types
These garments can be broadly classed as pre-made, made to measure, and homemade.

Pre-made
Padded underwear with pockets into which sections of padding can be inserted are marketed by companies catering to crossdressers. Many of these premade garments are often criticised for looking lumpy or false.

Made to measure
At least one company specialises in manufacturing custom made garments specifically designed from the purchaser's measurements. These garments are more expensive than pre-made or homemade garments but are generally well made.

Homemade
The cheapest form of hip and buttock padding is homemade. Information on making padding is available on web sites and in at least one book.

Using the person's own measurements and a table of comparative measurements, it is possible to determine how thick the padding needs to be at various places, such as the widest point on the hips and the fullest point on the buttocks.

Homemade padding is usually made by cutting a block of high-density polyurethane foam rubber to shape. This is the same type of foam as used for upholstery. The most common tool used for shaping the foam for this application is an electric knife. The block is usually cut as a flat piece which is wrapped around the hips and buttocks, rather than being carved as a curved piece. The foam is carved only on the inside, so that the outside surface remains smooth.

The padding is usually worn inside a compression garment such as one intended to be worn by females to lift and shape the buttocks.

See also
 Cleavage enhancement

References

Gender transitioning
Cross-dressing
Fashion
Trans women
Padding